This is a list of confirmed tornadoes produced by the tornado outbreak sequence of May 7–11, 2008, which spawned a total of at least 120 tornadoes confirmed across the southern United States from May 7 to May 11, 2008. The event consisted of three different systems and a total of 25 people were killed.

The first tornado outbreak took place on May 7–8 affecting at first Oklahoma on May 7. Then the activity shifted across the southeast on May 8 with two separate main areas of activity. One person was killed in North Carolina. The second tornado outbreak lasted for 24 hours on May 10–11 and produced the deadliest tornado of the outbreak sequence. Twenty-one people were killed from a tornado that traveled across northeastern Oklahoma and southern Missouri. Three other people were killed including two in Georgia and one more in Missouri.

Confirmed tornadoes

May 7 event

May 8 event

May 9 event

May 10 event

May 11 event

See also
 List of North American tornadoes and tornado outbreaks
 Tornadoes of 2008

Notes

References 

F4 tornadoes by date
Tornadoes of 2008
Tornado outbreak sequence